The Two Sergeants (Italian: I due sergenti) is a 1922 Italian silent historical drama film directed by Guido Brignone and starring Vasco Creti and Mercedes Brignone. It is an adaptation of Théodore Baudouin d'Aubigny's 1823 play of the same title, which has been made into several films. It is set during the Napoleonic Wars. It was released in Britain in 1925 under the title The Flame of Honour.

Cast
 Liliana Ardea 
 Giuseppe Brignone as Caporal Debin  
 Mercedes Brignone as Claudie  
 Ria Bruna as Sylviane 
 Giovanni Cimara 
 Giovanni Ciusa as Napoleon  
 Vasco Creti as Capitaine Devers / Bernard  
 Cesare Gani Carini 
 Oreste Grandi 
 Vittorio Pieri 
 Armand Pouget as Major Tebor  
 Lola Romanos as Alice Debin 
 Luigi Stinchi

References

Bibliography
 James Robert Parish & Kingsley Canham. Film Directors Guide: Western Europe. Scarecrow Press, 1976.

External links 
 

1922 films
1920s historical drama films
Italian historical drama films
Italian silent feature films
1920s Italian-language films
Films directed by Guido Brignone
Italian films based on plays
Films set in the 19th century
Italian black-and-white films
1922 drama films
Silent historical drama films
1920s Italian films